Qualification for boccia at the 2020 Summer Paralympics begin from 1 January 2018 to 31 December 2019. There are seven mixed events where 82 quotas are gender free and 34 are for females to make a total of 116 athletes.

Summary

Timeline
The following is a timeline of the qualification events for the boccia events at the 2020 Summer Paralympics.

Quotas
The qualification slots are allocated to the NPC not to the individual athlete or team. Individual World Ranking List slots are allocated to the individual athlete not to the NPC.
 An NPC can allocated one pair or team in a BC1/BC2 team, BC3 or BC4 pairs events.
 An NPC can qualify a maximum of two athletes per individual medal event.
 In each pair or team event, an NPC must have at least one female athlete in their pair or team.

Entry systems

Individuals
{| class="wikitable"
|-
!  !! BC1 !! BC2 !! BC3 !! BC4
|- align=center
|align=left|2019 RegionalChampionships || 3 || 3 || 3 || 3
|- align=center
|align=left|Individual World Ranking(No team/pair)''* || 3 || 3 || 3 || 3
|- align=center
|align=left|Individual World Ranking(In team/pair)* || 3 || 7 || 7 || 7
|- align=center
|align=left|Individual Female World Ranking(No team/pair) || 1 || 1 || 1 || 1
|- align=center
|align=left|From teams/pairs || 10 || 10 || 10 || 10
|-
! Total !! 20 !! 24 !! 24 !! 24
|}*''' up to the maximum entry per NPC.

Pairs and teams

Qualification summary
As of December 2019.

Pairs and team

Individual

Note
1 Mexico did not qualify for the BC1/BC2 team event, so Eduardo Sanchez Reyes represents as Mexico for NPC allocation and BISFed World Ranking for NPC that did not qualify for pairs and team events will be reduced by one.
2 Argentina did not qualify for the BC3 pairs event, so Stefania Ferrando represents as Argentina for NPC allocation and BISFed World Ranking for NPC that did not qualify for pairs and team events will be reduced by one.

References

Boccia at the 2020 Summer Paralympics